The Clinton Township School District is a comprehensive community public school district that serves children in pre-kindergarten through eighth grade in Clinton Township, in Hunterdon County, New Jersey, United States.

As of the 2020–21 school year, the district, comprised of four schools, had an enrollment of 1,214 students and 138.1 classroom teachers (on an FTE basis), for a student–teacher ratio of 8.8:1.

The district is classified by the New Jersey Department of Education as being in District Factor Group "I", the second-highest of eight groupings. District Factor Groups organize districts statewide, ostensibly to allow comparison by common socioeconomic characteristics of the local districts. From lowest socioeconomic status to highest, the categories are A, B, CD, DE, FG, GH, I and J.

Public school students in ninth through twelfth grades attend North Hunterdon High School in Annandale, which also serves students from Bethlehem Township, Clinton Town, Franklin Township, Lebanon Borough and Union Township. As of the 2020–21 school year, the high school had an enrollment of 1,257 students and 118.4 classroom teachers (on an FTE basis), for a student–teacher ratio of 10.6:1. The school is part of the North Hunterdon-Voorhees Regional High School District, which also includes students from Califon, Glen Gardner, Hampton, High Bridge, Lebanon Township and Tewksbury Township, who attend Voorhees High School in Lebanon Township.

History
The Clinton Township School District undertook a project to consider the possibility of withdrawing from the North Hunterdon-Voorhees Regional High School District to form an independent K-12 school district. In February 2005, the Clinton Township Board of Education commissioned a study to consider the educational and financial effects of a proposed withdrawal scenario for Clinton Township, with a report estimating that annual savings for the district could be as high as $1.2 million.

In 2018, it was announced that Clinton Township Middle School (CTMS) and Round Valley School (RVS) would be realigning grades, with CTMS switching from grades 7 and 8 to grades 6 through 8, and Round Valley now having students from grade 3 to 5, instead of 4 to 6.

Schools 
Schools in the district (with 2020–21 school enrollment data from the National Center for Education Statistics) are:

Patrick McGaheran School with 329 students in grades K-2
Melissa Goad, Principal
Round Valley School with 378 students in grades 3-5
Mary Postma, Principal
Clinton Township Middle School with 458 students in grades 6-8. Students in grades 7 and 8 from Lebanon Borough attend the district's middle school as part of a sending/receiving relationship with the Lebanon Borough School District.
Chris Steffner, Interim Principal

Administration
Core members of the district's administration are:
Dr. Melissa Stager, Superintendent
Mark Kramer, Interim Board Secretary / Business Administrator

Board of education
The district's board of education, comprised of nine members, sets policy and oversees the fiscal and educational operation of the district through its administration. As a Type II school district, the board's trustees are elected directly by voters to serve three-year terms of office on a staggered basis, with three seats up for election each year held (since 2012) as part of the November general election. The board appoints a superintendent to oversee the district's day-to-day operations and a business administrator to supervise the business functions of the district.

References

External links
Clinton Township School District

School Data for the Clinton Township School District, National Center for Education Statistics
North Hunterdon-Voorhees Regional High School District

Clinton Township, New Jersey
New Jersey District Factor Group I
School districts in Hunterdon County, New Jersey